Fidel LaBarba (September 29, 1905 – October 2, 1981) was an American boxer and sportswriter. He was born in New York City and grew up in Los Angeles, California.  LaBarba began his amateur career at fourteen, eventually winning  the flyweight division at the national Amateur Athletic Union tournament in Boston and later qualifying for the United States Olympic team.

Amateur career

LaBarba began boxing around age 12 or 13 in little amateur cards held weekly at places such as the Elks Club, which were promoted by Carlo Curtiss, who had been one of World Heavyweight Champion Jess Willard's managers. "Sometimes we would have nude women at these events," he said. The first known mention of "Young Fidel" is September 17, 1920, by the Los Angeles Times, announcing a boxing/wrestling show at the Italian picnic the next day at Selig Zoo where his opponent was to be "Battling Bennie", newsboy like Fidel. Eventually, Central Junior High School boxing instructor Bob Howard saw his potential. According to an interview published January 28, 1927 in some United States newspapers, LaBarba mentioned that he defeated a boy named Dave Mariney (a.k.a. Marini) for the high school championship. Based upon this win, his friends suggested he join the amateurs, which he did. By this, he likely meant he joined the A.A.U. Fidel found it ironic that his first "official" amateur opponent was none other than Dave Mariney. This was at a semi-monthly boxing show sponsored by the Los Angeles Athletic Club (L.A.A.C). "It looked like a crime to match the two," reported the Los Angeles Times November 4, 1920. LaBarba was about four feet tall, and his opponent a foot and a half taller. "But LaBarba soon showed he knew how to take care of himself."

George Blake reportedly was the referee at that fight. He and Charles Keppen ran these L.A.A.C. shows. Blake had come to Los Angeles from Chicago in 1904. He had been a United States Army boxing instructor during World War I. By the early 1920s, Blake was a well-known referee for boxing venues such as Jack Doyle's Vernon Arena, and would become the regular referee at the soon-to-be-built Hollywood Legion Stadium. He was much-respected and known as a man of impeccable character. Blake took an interest in the young and talented Fidel LaBarba, and asked Bob Howard to have him come down to the club. " I was asked four or five times, but was embarrassed to go," LaBarba explained. He owned only one pair of torn tennis shoes. He finally mustered the fortitude to go see Blake; thus started a very long relationship. LaBarba continued to have many amateur bouts. "We would receive a gift worth $35.00," he noted. "Later, they would give us a gift certificate to buy clothes at places like the Broadway, or Sears."

Meanwhile, LaBarba attended Central Jr. High School, and then Lincoln High School—both in Los Angeles. He enjoyed playing basketball, baseball, and especially football. He was the quarterback for the "lightweight" (midget) football team. While in high school, he sometimes worked nights until midnight, racking pins at a bowling alley, then sleeping on a cot in back of the building. In the morning he would grab a bite to eat at the local restaurant, then head off to school about a mile away.

By 1924, LaBarba had lost only one bout after some 30-plus recorded contests. George Blake took eight of his L.A.A.C. boxers to Boston June 1924 for the Olympic trials, and LaBarba qualified. LaBarba won the gold medal in the flyweight division at the 1924 Summer Olympics in Paris. After the Games, Blake arranged an amateur card at Doyle's Vernon Arena with all the American Olympic fighters, at which LaBarba finished out his amateur career.

Olympic Results
 Jul 15, 1924		E. Warwick (England)	@ Velodrome d'Hiver, Paris, France		W-3 (first round)
 Jul 16, 1924		Gaetano Lanzi (Italy)	@ Velodrome d'Hiver, Paris, France 	TKO-2 (second round)
 Jul 18, 1924		Rennis/Rennie (Canada)	@ Velodrome d'Hiver, Paris, France		W-3 (quarter-final Round)
 Jul 19?, 1924		Rinaldo Castellenghi 	@ Velodrome d'Hiver, Paris, France		W-3 (semi-final Round)
 Jul 20, 1924		James McKenzie (G.B.) 	@ Velodrome d'Hiver, Paris, France 	W-3 (final)

Pro career
Although still in high school, LaBarba turned professional that same year.

On August 22, 1925, LaBarba defeated Frankie Genaro in a convincing 10 round decision to win the American Flyweight title. In 1927, he defeated Elky Clark to win the vacant flyweight championship of the world. La Barba dominated the fight, knocked Clark down five times and won all twelve rounds.

Seven months later, LaBarba retired to enter Stanford University. Less than a year later, however, he returned to the ring as a featherweight. He won his first five fights, and in 1931 split two decisions with Kid Chocolate.  On May 22, 1931, he was given an opportunity to win the world featherweight title, but was out pointed by Battling Battalino.

LaBarba's career was prematurely curtailed when he suffered a detached retina in training for a fight against Kid Chocolate for the New York featherweight title.  On December 9, 1932, LaBarba not only lost the fight in a close decision, but went blind in his eye.  After the fight, he underwent surgery to repair the tear, but it was unsuccessful and he eventually had to have the eye removed.

Later life
In 1933, he was forced to retire, and returned to Stanford, where he earned a degree in journalism. After graduating from Stanford he worked as a sportswriter, and later worked in public relations, as a screenwriter, and as a technical advisor in Hollywood for boxing movies.

Fidel LaBarba died of heart failure in Los Angeles, California, in 1981.  He was inducted into the International Boxing Hall of Fame in 1996.

Professional boxing record
All information in this section is derived from BoxRec, unless otherwise stated.

Official record

All newspaper decisions are officially regarded as “no decision” bouts and are not counted in the win/loss/draw column.

Unofficial record

Record with the inclusion of newspaper decisions in the win/loss/draw column.

See also
List of flyweight boxing champions

References

External links

Fidel LaBarba - CBZ Profile

|-

1905 births
1981 deaths
Boxers from New York City
Boxers from Los Angeles
Stanford University alumni
Featherweight boxers
Flyweight boxers
Olympic boxers of the United States
Boxers at the 1924 Summer Olympics
Olympic gold medalists for the United States in boxing
World boxing champions
American people of Italian descent
World flyweight boxing champions
World Boxing Association champions
Winners of the United States Championship for amateur boxers
International Boxing Hall of Fame inductees
Medalists at the 1924 Summer Olympics
American male boxers